Raewyn is a feminine given name.

People
 Raewyn Alexander, New Zealand writer
 Raewyn Atkinson, New Zealand ceramicist
 Raewyn Connell, Australian sociologist
 Raewyn Dalziel, New Zealand historian
 Raewyn Hall, New Zealand football player 
 Raewyn Hill, New Zealand-Australian choreographer

Fictional characters
 Raewyn, a character in World of Warcraft

Feminine given names